Oberto Della Torre (1617 in Genoa – 1698 in Genoa) was the 130th Doge of the Republic of Genoa and king of Corsica.

Biography 
During his mandate as Doge, the eighty-fifth in biennial succession and the one hundred and thirtyth in republican history, some disagreements with the Spanish Governor  of the neighbouring Duchy of Milan are remembered due to the blockade of the income of the Genoese nobles in that territory, on the other hand, the Doge had cordial relations with the Charles II, as the Spanish Empire was a great ally of the Genoese Republic. After the end of his Dogate on 1 September 1691, Oberto Della Torre retired to private life. He died in Genoa in 1698.

See also 

 Republic of Genoa
 Doge of Genoa

References 

17th-century Doges of Genoa
1617 births
1698 deaths